Continuous hyperthermic peritoneal perfusion (CHPP) is a procedure in which the abdominal cavity is bathed in warm fluid that contains anticancer drugs.  It is a kind of hyperthermia therapy.

References

Oncothermia